Ted Ladd is an American entrepreneur and academic at Harvard University and Hult International Business School.

Career
Ladd is a professor of entrepreneurship at the Hult International Business School. Based on its San Francisco campus, he was the former Dean of the campus, Dean of Global Research, and founding Academic Director of the Doctorate in Business Administration. He also teaches students on Hult's campuses in Boston, New York, London, Shanghai, and Dubai. He also is an instructor on platform entrepreneurship at Harvard University and Stanford University  He was a visitor professor at the Copenhagen Business School and the lead faculty member for social entrepreneurship at the Bainbridge Graduate School, now part of Presidio Graduate School, in San Francisco, California.

Ladd was the Director of Ecosystems at WIMM Labs. Ladd was the platform evangelist for Palm Inc. to describe the future of handheld mobile technology. He was the VP of Business Development at HOMER energy, which was acquired by UL. He founded, led, secured funding, sold, or otherwise participated in several other startups.

Ladd is a director of Lower Valley Energy, which serves electricity and natural gas to businesses and residents in northwestern Wyoming, as well as portions of eastern Idaho and southern Montana. He is on the Advisory Board of the Wyoming Small Business Development Center, which is jointly funded by the U.S. federal Small Business Administration, the University of Wyoming, and the Wyoming Business Council. He was a director of the latter from 2003 to 2009, appointed by Governor Freudenthal and confirmed by the Wyoming Senate. He served as a director of the Community Foundation of Jackson Hole. He was a candidate for Wyoming's sole seat in the U.S. House of Representatives in 2004. Following that race, Ladd was named one of Wyoming 40 under 40 He is a member of the Advisory Board at Nth Venture,, a venture studio that incubates early-stage start-up businesses.

Research 
Ladd focuses on the processes by which entrepreneurs design and test new ideas to create new companies, especially as multi-sided platforms (e.g. Lyft and AirBnb). His recent publications include:
 "Innovating with Impact" with Alessandro Lanteri, published by the Economist 
 "The Platform Canvas" with Marcel Alleins and Markus Proesch, winner of the Best Conceptual Paper USASBE annual conference  and described in Forbes 
 "Success and Self-Confidence Through Rejection", TEDxHultAshridge 
 "The Limits of Lean", Harvard Business Review 
 "The Embedded Enterprise", Stanford Social Innovation Review 
 "Customer Development and Effectuation: A Review of Textbooks to Teach a Contemporary Introduction of Entrepreneurship", Management Teaching Review 
 “Business Models at the Bottom of the Pyramid: Leveraging Context in Undeveloped Markets.” Proceedings of the Academy of Management Annual Meeting, 2014 
 “How To Reinvent Your Business To Thrive After The Coronavirus” Forbes 

A complete list can be found at ORCID.

Awards
 Best Conceptual Paper at the U.S. Association for Small Business and Entrepreneurship annual conference 
 Fulbright Scholarship: SyCip Distinguished Lecturing Award in the Philippines 
 Research Fellow with the Engaged Practitioner-Scholar program at Case Western Reserve University  
 Best Teacher in the Program at Hult: 2015, 2016, 2017, 2018, 2019, 2020.
 Paper "most relevant to practicing entrepreneurs" at the U.S. Association for Small Business and Entrepreneurship 
 Best paper in Social Entrepreneurship at the Academy of Management

Education 
Ladd received a PhD in management from the Weatherhead School of Management at Case Western Reserve University, an MBA from the Wharton School at the University of Pennsylvania, a joint master's degree in international economics with honors from the School of Advanced International Studies (SAIS) from Johns Hopkins University, a BA from Cornell University cum laude as a triple major in biology (focused on ecology and systematics), government and technical sociology, and a farrier's certificate at the Oklahoma School of Horseshoeing.

References 

Case Western Reserve University alumni
Wharton School of the University of Pennsylvania alumni
Hult International Business School faculty
Living people
Cornell University alumni
People from Wyoming
American energy industry businesspeople
American educators
1969 births